Christopher Jason Hanke, often credited as Christopher J. Hanke, (born March 18, 1976) is an American actor and singer known for his roles on Broadway and television.

Early life 
Hanke was born in Hot Springs, Arkansas, the oldest of five children. He spent his childhood in Hot Springs Village, Arkansas. Hanke was accepted to medical school, but decided to defer his admission.

Career 
Hanke has played leading roles in various Broadway and off-Broadway shows.  His roles have included Ethan Girard in the national tour of The Full Monty (2002) and Nick Piazza in Fame on 42nd Street (2003, off-Broadway); and on Broadway as J.T. in In My Life (2005), Mark Cohen in Rent (2007) and Baldwin in Cry-Baby (2008); and Claude in Hair (2008 – Central Park production).

Hanke has also appeared on television, playing the series regular role of the inexperienced transplant coordinator Ryan Abbott on the CBS TV series Three Rivers.  He had a guest-starring role on ABC's Brothers & Sisters in 2010. He also has a recurring role in the television show Big Love as a Mormon intern in the State Senate.

Hanke appeared on Broadway as Bud Frump in Rob Ashford's 2011 revival of How to Succeed in Business Without Really Trying, alongside Daniel Radcliffe who played the lead role of J. Pierrepont Finch, and his replacement Darren Criss. Hanke replaced Michael Urie in the Off-Broadway solo comedy "Buyer & Cellar," at the Barrow Street Theatre, from March 18, 2014, until its closing on July 27. From June 23–30, 2015, he played "Corny Collins" in Hairspray at The Muny.

On October 7, 2015, a cast recording of Cry-Baby was released, featuring most of the original cast, including Hanke as Baldwin.

In 2016, he was cast as Fabian on Devious Maids. His character is a hairdresser and a self-proclaimed "hair magician".

References

External links

Christopher Hanke at Internet Off-Broadway Database
Christopher J. Hanke at the BroadwayWorld Database

American male actors
1976 births
Living people
Actors from Hot Springs, Arkansas